Muse is a pornographic drama series written and directed by Kayden Kross, and produced by Deeper, and distributed by Pulse Distribution. It stars an ensemble cast that includes  Maitland Ward, Adriana Chechik, Gianna Dior, Lena Paul,  Scarlit Scandal and Manuel Ferrara. The series has received overall positive feedback from the industry, winning dozens of major industry accolades.

The first season was released on September 18, 2020, and the second on September 16, 2021. The first season received eleven nominations at the 38th AVN Awards, winning seven, including Grand Reel, Best Screenplay and Best Directing – Drama for Kross, Best Actress for Ward, and Best Editing for Duboko. For her performance, Ward won two XBIZ, XRCO and XCritic Awards for Best Actress.

Episodes

Season 1 (2020)

Special (2020)

Season 2 (2021)

Reception

Critical response 
The series has received generally positive reviews from critics. An All Adult Network critic called the series an "exquisite piece of film making" and continued saying "...the shadings, looks, backgrounds, locales and pacing that Ms. Kross gives this piece really put this project over the top. Then add in some very crisp, sharp cinematography that provides masterful visuals and you have something very special. It has a number of well deserved nominations in the upcoming AVN awards and others and they are very well deserved." Another adult film critic website Die-Screaming.com compliments director Kayden Kross writing "Kayden has firmly established herself as one of the most talented creative forces currently working in smut and the joints she’s churning out with her Deeper studio are consistently some of the most expertly crafted films of any hardcore studio anywhere in the world." On the adult review aggregator AdultDVDTalk the film received extremely positive reviews, seeing a 4.6 out of 5 stars on sixteen reviews. In the sites featured review on the film the reviewer stated, "Needless to say, this flick is absolutely a must-see. Even those who aren''t typically inclined toward features will likely marvel at just how good it is. Indeed, there is little doubt that what Kross and Ward are doing as a team right now is several cuts above the competition and, quite frankly, may well be changing and reforming the broader adult landscape...both in terms of quality and public perception."

Awards and nominations

References

External links 
 

2020s pornographic films
American film series
Drama film series
Film series introduced in 2020
Pornographic film series